Zhuliangqiao Township is a rural township in Ningxiang County, Changsha City, Hunan Province, China. It is surrounded by Oujiangcha Town on the northwest, Qiaokou Town and Jinggang Town on the north, and Shuangjiangkou Town on the east. Zhuliangqiao township merged to Shuangjiangkou town on November 19, 2015.

Administrative division
The township is divided into the following ten villages: Luoxiangxin Village, Xinyan Village, Chaziqiao Village, Zuojiashan Village, Zhuliangqiao Village,Nantang Village, Tangui Village, Xinggui Village, Yunji Village, and Lianhuashan Village.

Economy
Citrus fruits, such as limes and lemons, and tobacco production play an important part in the local economy.

Culture
Huaguxi, a traditional form of Chinese opera, is a locally influential theatrical art.

References

Historic towns and townships of Ningxiang